Hans Reimann (1889–1969) was a German satirist, novelist, and playwright. He wrote under the pseudonyms Max Bunge, Hans Heinrich, Artur Sünder, Hanns Heinz Vampir, and Andreas Zeltner.

Biography
Albert Johannes Reimann was born on 18 November 1889 in Leipzig where he grew up. He studied German philology and art history at the Kunstakademie in Munich. After serving in the German army during World War I, he published the satirical journal Der Drache (The Dragon) in Leipzig from 1919 till 1921  from 1924 till 1929 the Stachelschwein (Porcupine)  in Frankfurt on the  Main. He worked also for the satirical Simplicissimus and Die Weltbühne and founded the cabarets "Retorte" (in Leipzig) und "Astoria" (in Frankfurt on the Main.). He lived in Berlin since 1925.

Having expressed critiques of the Nazis and planned a Hitler parody under the title Mein Krampf (My Cramp), he experienced great difficulties and was blacklisted by the Nazi regime. He wrote under several pseudonyms and also co-wrote with Heinrich Spoerl. A secret report by Carl Zuckmayer, who worked for a US agency, suggested "that Reimann published in anti-semitic journals and found ways of arranging himself with the Nazis" (a similar allegation by Moritz Lederer was in a 1958 court case judged unfounded). After the fall of the "Third Reich" in 1945, Reimann was forbidden to publish in Allied-occupied Germany until 1948. Then he began writing for the Munich satirical journal Simpl, moved 1951 to Schmalenbeck near Hamburg and published Literazzia. He died on  13 June 1969 in Schmalenbeck.

Reimann is the grandfather of the German lyricist Andreas Reimann.

Works
1916: Die Dame mit den schönen Beinen, Groteske
1917: Das verbotene Buch, Grotesken
1917: Die Dinte wider das Blut (unter dem Pseudonym Artur Sünder)
1918: Das Paukerbuch, Satiren
1918: Tyll, autobiographisch
1921: Ewers. Ein garantiert verwahrloster Schundroman in Lumpen, Fetzchen, Mätzchen und Unterhosen von Hanns Heinz Vampir
1921-31: Sächsische Miniaturen
1922: Hedwig Courths-Mahler. Schlichte Geschichten fürs traute Heim (mit Bildern von George Grosz)
1924: Der Ekel (gemeinsam mit Toni Impekoven), Komödie, Erstaufführung 1926  ; richtig vermutlich "Das Ekel" 
1928: Komponist wider Willen, Roman
1928: Neue Sächsische Miniaturen. Gemeinsam with Karl Holtz (Illustrationen). Reissner, Dresden 1928.
1929: Das Buch von Leipzig
1930: Das Buch von Frankfurt. Mainz/Wiesbaden
1931: Vergnügliches Handbuch der deutschen Sprache
1931: Sächsisch. Was nicht im Wörterbuch steht
1932: Quartett zu dritt, Roman
1933: Der wirkliche Knigge, Dresden, Reissner
1934: Frau ohne Herz. Theaterstück in 5 Bildern, Berlin, Dreiklang (unter dem Pseudonym Andreas Zeltner)
1935: Mensch, mach dir's leicht! Des Wirklichen Knigge (2. Aufl. von Der wirkliche Knigge), Dresden, Reissner 
1935: Motorbummel durch den Orient, Berlin, Müller & Kiepenheuer
1935: Der Strohmann, Berlin, Dreiklang (Schwank)
1935: Ein Sonntagskind. Lustspiel-Operette in 7 Bildern, Berlin, Vertriebsstelle und Verlag Deutscher Bühnenschriftsteller und Bühnenkomponisten (Musik von Karlheinz Gutheim)
1936: Freut Euch des Lebens! (zusammen mit Bruno Wellenkamp), Verlag Arbeitsfront (eine Revue für KdF)
1936: Das Buch vom Kitsch, München, Piper
1936: Die Reise nach Nizza1937: Vergnügliches Handbuch der deutschen Sprache (3. Aufl.), München, Piper
1937: Flocco1939: Du, hör´ mal zu! Lustiges, Berlin, Siegismund
1939: Mit 100 Jahren noch ein Kind, Berlin, Schützen-Verlag
1939: Des Teufels Phiole. Ein utoparodistischer Roman, Berlin, Schützen-Verlag
1940: Der kleine Spaßvogel, Berlin, Curtius, 1940
1940: Der Tolpatsch. Lustspiel in 3 Akten nach dem Roman von Hans Ribau, (zusammen mit Viktor de Kowa), Berlin, Ahn & Simrock
1940: Du, hör´ mal zu! Lustiges, Berlin, Siegismund (2. Aufl.),in: Deutsche Soldatenbücherrei, Bd. 4]
1940: Herr Knurpel. Fachsimpeleien um eine schnurrige Figur, Leipzig, Wehnert & Co.
1940: Mit 100 Jahren noch ein Kind, Berlin, Schützen-Verlag (4. Aufl.)
1940: Tamerlan, Wien u. a., Ibach (mit R. A. Stemmle)
1940: Die Jagdhütte. Schwank, Berlin, Ahn & Simrock, 1940 (zusammen mit G. V. Otten) 
1941: Liebe und Gips, Berlin, Frommhagen
1941: Lachendes Feldgrau, Bremen, Burmester
1942: Vergnügliches Handbuch der deutschen Sprache, München, Piper (4. Aufl.)
1942: Hast du Töne!, Berlin, Schützen-Verlag
1942: Herr Knurpel, Leipzig, Wehnert & Co. (11.-20.Tsd.)
1942: Motorbummel durch den Orient, Berlin, Arnold (Neuauflage)
1942: Die kobaltblaue Tarnkappe, München, Braun & Schneider
1951: Hinter den Kulissen unserer Sprache, Untertitel: Ein heiteres Kolleg1956: Reimann reist nach Babylon, Aufzeichnungen
1957: Der Mogelvogel, Roman
1959: Mein blaues Wunder, Autobiographie

Selected filmography
Screenwriter
 Such a Rascal (1934, based on the novel Die Feuerzangenbowle by Heinrich Spoerl)
 Kleiner Mann – ganz groß (1938, based on a play by Edgar Kahn and Ludwig Bender)
 Der Sündenbock (1940)
Actor
 One Hour of Happiness (1931), as Nachtwächter
 Storms of Passion (1932), as Max
 Scandal in Budapest (1933)
 Kleiner Mann – ganz groß (1938), as Emil Wurm

Film adaptationsThe Scoundrel (1931, based on the play The Scoundrel)The Scoundrel (1939, based on the play The Scoundrel)The Domestic Tyrant (1959, based on the play The Scoundrel)

Referencesdtv-Lexikon'', Band 15, Deutscher Taschenbuch Verlag, Munich, 1970

External links
 
 

1889 births
1969 deaths
German humorists
German male novelists
German male dramatists and playwrights
20th-century German novelists
20th-century German dramatists and playwrights
20th-century German male writers
German satirists
Writers from Leipzig
German male non-fiction writers